António Manuel Viana Mendonça (born 9 October 1982) is an Angolan retired footballer who played as a right winger.

Club career
Born in Luanda, Mendonça moved to Portugal in January 2000 at only 17, signing with Varzim S.C. in the second division, and scored ten goals in 30 games in his first full season to help to Primeira Liga promotion. He appeared in 28 matches in the following campaign (18 starts, two goals), with the Póvoa do Varzim side retaining their league status.

From 2003 to 2007, after a brief loan, Mendonça appeared regularly for Varzim, with the club again in the second level. He returned to the top flight in 2007–08, but played in only 14 games for C.F. Os Belenenses and C.F. Estrela da Amadora combined, which prompted a return to his previous team, still in division two; whilst with Varzim, on 10 February 2007, he scored the 2–1 home winner that ousted giants S.L. Benfica from the Taça de Portugal.

In the 2009 offseason, Mendonça returned to his country and signed with G.D. Interclube. The following year he joined C.D. Primeiro de Agosto, his first club as a senior.

International career
Mendonça made his debut for Angola in April 1999, before his 17th birthday. He was chosen the best player at the 2001 African Youth Championship.

Mendonça was picked for the squad that appeared at the 2006 FIFA World Cup, a first-ever for the country. He played in all three group stage games – 270 minutes – as the Palancas Negras managed two points; additionally, he participated in two Africa Cup of Nations tournaments.

International goals
Scores and results list Angola's goal tally first.

References

External links

1982 births
Living people
Footballers from Luanda
Angolan footballers
Association football wingers
Girabola players
C.D. Primeiro de Agosto players
G.D. Interclube players
F.C. Bravos do Maquis players
Primeira Liga players
Liga Portugal 2 players
Varzim S.C. players
G.D. Chaves players
C.F. Os Belenenses players
C.F. Estrela da Amadora players
Angola international footballers
2006 FIFA World Cup players
2006 Africa Cup of Nations players
2008 Africa Cup of Nations players
Angolan expatriate footballers
Expatriate footballers in Portugal
Angolan expatriate sportspeople in Portugal